Mar Vermelho is a municipality located in the Brazilian state of Alagoas. Its population is 3,494 (2020) and its area is 91,741 km².

References

Municipalities in Alagoas